Misled Youth or Youth Gone Astray is a 1929 German silent drama film directed by Richard Löwenbein and starring Fritz Alberti, Erna Morena, and Dolly Davis. It was one of a number of  during the Weimar Era that addressed the issue of juvenile delinquency. The film's art direction was by Hans Jacoby.

Cast

References

Bibliography

External links

1929 films
Films of the Weimar Republic
1929 drama films
German silent feature films
German drama films
Films directed by Richard Löwenbein
German black-and-white films
Silent drama films
1920s German films